The 1986 Pontins Professional was the thirteenth edition of the professional invitational snooker tournament which took place between 10 and 17 May 1986 at Pontin's in Prestatyn, Wales.

The tournament featured eight professional players. The quarter-final matches were contested over the best of 9 frames, the semi-final matches over the best of 11 frames, and the final over the best of 17 frames.

Terry Griffiths won the event for the third time and the second in a row, beating Willie Thorne 9–6 in the final.

Main draw

References

Pontins Professional
Snooker competitions in Wales
Pontins Professional
Pontins Professional
Pontins Professional